Henri de Gondi, duc de Retz (1590–1659) was a French nobleman of the Gondi family.  He was the son of Charles de Gondi, duc de Retz and Antoinette (1574 † 25 April 1618), lady of Château-Gontier (daughter of Léonor d'Orléans, duc de Longueville).  He became duc de Retz on his father's death in 1596.  He married Jeanne de Beaupreau, and they had 2 daughters.

1590 births
1659 deaths
French military personnel
16th-century peers of France
17th-century peers of France